Milan–San Remo (in Italian Milano-Sanremo), also called "The Spring classic" or "La Classicissima", is an annual road cycling race between Milan and Sanremo, in Northwest Italy. With a distance of 298 km (~185.2 miles) it is the longest  professional one-day race in modern cycling. It is the first major classic race of the season, usually held on the third Saturday of March. The first edition was held in 1907.

It is traditionally the first of the five Monuments of the season, considered to be one of the most prestigious one-day events in cycling. It was the opening race of the UCI Road World Cup series until the series was replaced by the UCI ProTour in 2005 and the World Tour in 2011.

The most successful rider with seven victories is Belgian Eddy Merckx. Italian Costante Girardengo achieved 11 podium finishes in the interwar period, winning the race six times. In modern times, German Erik Zabel and Spaniard Óscar Freire have recorded four and three wins respectively.

Milan–San Remo is considered a sprinters classic because of its mainly flat course, (although the Poggio climb close to the finish is an opportunity for rouleurs), whereas the other Italian Monument race, the Giro di Lombardia, held in autumn, is considered a climbers classic.

From 1999 to 2005, a women's race, the Primavera Rosa, was organized alongside the men's but at a shorter distance.

History

The pioneering days
The idea of a bike race between Milan and Sanremo originated from the Unione Sportiva Sanremese. A first amateur race was held on 2 and 3 April 1906 over two stages (Milan–Acqui Terme and Acqui Terme–Sanremo); albeit with little success. Milanese journalist Tullo Morgagni, who had launched the Tour of Lombardy in 1905, put forth the idea of organizing a professional cycling race in a single day over the course. He proposed the project to Eugenio Costamagna, the director of the popular sports newspaper Gazzetta dello Sport, who took on the organization.

On 14 April 1907 the first official edition of Milan–San Remo was held. The start was at the  Conca Fallata inn of Milan at 5 a.m. Sixty riders registered, but only 33 took the start. The inaugural contest was especially hard as it was affected by exceptionally cold weather. It was won by Frenchman Lucien Petit-Breton, who completed the 286 kilometers (177 miles) in an average speed of 26.206 km/h (16.5 mph). Only 14 riders finished.

The race was a commercial success and attracted some of the best riders of European cycling, prompting the Gazzetta dello Sport to organize a second edition in 1908, won by Belgium's Cyrille Van Hauwaert. The first Italian winner of Milan–San Remo was Luigi Ganna who won in 1909 by an hour over Frenchman Emile Georget.

In 1910 the Primavera gained eternal fame and a place in cycling legend because of the extreme weather conditions. Riders needed to take refuge in the houses along the roads because a severe snowstorm scourged the peloton. Just four out of 63 riders finished the race. Frenchman Eugène Christophe won, even though he thought he had taken a wrong road and did not realize he was the first to reach Sanremo. Christophe finished the race in 12 hours and 24 minutes, making it the slowest edition ever. Giovanni Cocchi finished second at 1h 17 minutes from the winner.

La Classicissima

After the pioneering days of the race, began the era of Costante Girardengo, who connected his name indelibly to the classic. From 1917 to 1928 Girardengo had a record 11 podium finishes, six times as winner. Subsequent years were marked by the rivalry between Learco Guerra and Alfredo Binda, whose emulation caused them to lose several certain victories. A similar rivalry was the one in the 1940s with the mythical years of Fausto Coppi and Gino Bartali, whose duels were the subject of intense coverage and resulted in epic races.

Milan–San Remo was at the peak of its popularity and the Italian press started to coin the untranslatable term La Classicissima, the greatest of all classics. From 1935 to 1953 the race was run every year on 19 March, the feast of patron Saint Joseph, hence the press in predominantly Catholic Italy gave it its other nickname, la Gara di San Giuseppe (Saint Joseph's Race). In 1949 the race finished for the first time on the iconic Via Roma, a busy shopping street in the heart of Sanremo.

As from the 1950s the race was mainly won by Belgian and Spanish sprinters, and after 1953, Italian riders could not seal a victory for 17 years. In 1960 race director Vincenzo Torriani added the climb of the Poggio, just before the arrival in Sanremo. The intent was to make the race finale harder, but the decision did not have the aspired effect and the streak of non-Italian victories continued.

In 1966 began the legendary era of Eddy Merckx, who achieved an unsurpassed record of seven victories. Seven wins is also the record number of victories by a rider in a single classic to date. After the Cannibal'''s streak no rider could dominate Milan–San Remo again until 1997, when German Erik Zabel began a series of four victories and two second places.

The Sprinters Classic

In 1990 Italian Gianni Bugno set a race record of 6h 25 m 06 seconds to win by 4 seconds over Rolf Gölz, averaging 45.8 kmh (28.45 mph). Another memorable running was the one in 1992, when Seán Kelly caught Moreno Argentin in the descent of the Poggio and beat the Italian in a two-man sprint. It was Kelly's penultimate career win. In between Erik Zabel's wins, Andrei Tchmil won the 1999 contest, after he launched a decisive attack under the one-kilometer banner and narrowly stayed ahead of the sprinting peloton, with Zabel coming in second place.

In 2004 Zabel could have won a fifth time, but lost to Óscar Freire only because he lifted his arms to celebrate and stopped pedalling too early. Freire would go on to secure a total of three Primavera wins in later years. In 2008 the finish was moved to a different location for the first time in 59 years, due to road works on the Via Roma. Swiss Fabian Cancellara was the first winner on the Lungomare Italo Calvino, after an ultimate solo attack in the streets of San Remo.

In 2009 the 100th edition of Milan–San Remo was held, won by British sprinter Mark Cavendish on his first attempt. Cavendish beat Australian Heinrich Haussler in a millimeter sprint.

The race of 2013 was affected by abysmal weather conditions from start to finish. Heavy snowfall and below-zero temperatures forced organizers to shorten the race by 52 kilometres (32 miles) eliminating two key climbs – the Passo del Turchino and Le Manie – and arranging a bus transfer for the race to begin a second time. The race was won by German Gerald Ciolek who outsprinted Peter Sagan and Fabian Cancellara.

In 2015 race director Mauro Vegni decided to move the finish back to the Via Roma after seven years on the seaside, stating the change would be for 2015 and beyond. German John Degenkolb won the race ahead of previous winner Alexander Kristoff. The 2016 race was won by French sprinter Arnaud Démare in a bunch sprint, but Démare was accused after the race of having used the tow of his teamcar to rejoin the pack on the Cipressa climb. Démare rebuffed these allegations, stating that the race commissioners were right behind him and would have disqualified him had he done something illegal.

In 2017 Michał Kwiatkowski became the first Polish winner of a monument in a three-up sprint finish with world champion Peter Sagan and Julian Alaphilippe after the trio broke clear on the race's final climb – the Poggio di San Remo.

The 2020 edition was forced to move to August due to the COVID-19 pandemic in Italy, making it the first ever summer edition of the Spring classic. The edition was won by Belgian Wout van Aert.

In May 2022 RCS Sport announced a plan to organize a women’s edition in 2023. But in 2023 it was still only a plan, and it was not yet added to the female World Tour calendar. In the male edition the start city was not Milano, but Abbiategrasso.

Route

Present course

Upon its inception, Milan–San Remo was conceived as a straightforward line from Milan, the industrial heart of Northern Italy, to San Remo, the fashionable seaside resort on the Italian Riviera with its trademark Belle Epoque villas. The race starts on the Piazza del Duomo in the heart of Milan and immediately heads to the southwest, over the plains of Lombardy and Piedmont, along the cities of Pavia, Voghera, Tortona, Novi Ligure and Ovada. As the race enters Liguria, the peloton addresses the Passo del Turchino, the first climb of the day, after 140 km.

After the descent of the Turchino the race reaches the Ligurian Sea in Voltri at halfway point. From here the course follows the Aurelia highway to the west, with its spectacular and typical scenery along the Ligurian Coast. The race crosses the towns of Arenzano, Varazze, Savona, Finale Ligure, Pietra Ligure, Loano, Borghetto Santo Spirito, Ceriale and Albenga, followed by the seaside resorts along the Riviera dei Fiori (Alassio, Andora, Diano Marina and Imperia). Between Alassio and Imperia, three short hills along the coast are included: the Capo Mele, Capo Cervo and Capo Berta. In San Lorenzo al Mare the course turns inwards to the Cipressa, the next climb, with its top at 22 km from the finish. After the towns of Santo Stefano al Mare and Arma di Taggia comes the last and most famous climb, the Poggio di Sanremo, in fact a suburb of Sanremo, built upon a hill along the sea.

From the top of the Poggio, 5.4 km from the finish, the course heads down via a fast and curvy descent towards the center of Sanremo, where the race traditionally finishes on the Via Roma, the city's illustrious shopping street.

Race characteristics
Being the longest professional one-day race, Milan–San Remo is an unusual test of endurance early in the season. It is often won not by the fastest sprinter, but by the strongest and best prepared rider with a strong sprint finish. The Cipressa and Poggio have foiled many sprinters who could not stay with the front group.

In the early years the only significant difficulty was the Passo del Turchino, which was often a pivotal site of the race – but when cycling became more professional, the climb was not demanding enough and too far from the finish to be decisive. In 1960 the Poggio, a 4 km climb just a few kilometres before the finish, was introduced. In 1982 the Cipressa, near Imperia, was added. The other hills are the Capo Mele, Capo Cervo and Capo Berta. From 2008 to 2014 the organizers added the climb of Le Manie as well, between the Turchino and the Capi. The Turchino and Le Manie are longer climbs, meant to cause a first selection in the peloton, while the Capi, Cipressa and Poggio are rather short, inviting attackers to distance the peloton.

In recent years there has rarely been a big selection in the latter stages of the race. Many sprinters are able to keep up with the main peloton on the climbs, and therefore the race most often ends in a group sprint. Nonetheless, the location of the Poggio close to the finish has often meant that riders' position on top of the Poggio is crucial in order to win the race.

Despite its flat course and long finishing straight, sprinters' teams have been foiled from time to time by a determined attack on the last hills. Good examples include Laurent Jalabert and Maurizio Fondriest escaping in 1995 and staying ahead to the finish. In 2003, Paolo Bettini attacked with Luca Paolini and Mirko Celestino to stay ahead. In 2012, Vincenzo Nibali and Fabian Cancellara attacked on the Poggio, followed by Australian Simon Gerrans, who outsprinted them at the finish. In 2018, Nibali attacked on the final bends of the Poggio, resisting the return of the group to win by a small margin.

Proposed changes
Milan–San Remo has had few significant course changes since its first edition, and organizers have made it a matter of honour to stay true to the original intent.

The last change to the course was the inclusion of Le Manie, in 2008. In September 2013, organiser RCS Sport announced the race would include the Pompeiana climb between the Cipressa and Poggio. To keep the race at a reasonable distance, it would exclude Le Manie. The Pompeiana, named after the village the road passes, climbs five kilometres with a 13% maximum gradient, and would therefore be the most difficult climb in the race finale.

The proposed route was reversed just weeks before the race in March 2014, when the Pompeiana had been damaged by recent landslides, making it too dangerous for a cycling race to pass. Hence the race was re-routed and made more traditional and sprinter-friendly. This led to a number of sprinters, who had earlier ruled themselves out due to the addition of the extra climb, including Mark Cavendish, declaring their interest in riding again.

In 2015, the climb of Le Manie was cut from the race, and neither was the Pompeiana included in the trajectory. With this pre-2008 route, race organizers stated they want to respect the race's traditional course.

2020 edition

The 2020 edition, already extraordinary in being held in the midst of summer, followed an utterly new route. This was due to the extraordinary conditions determined first by the pandemics, and then by the sudden refusal, just a few weeks before the race, by the mayors of several seaside town to let the race pass through the coastal highway, or "Via Aurelia", heavily engaged by tourist traffic in August whereas it is much less suffocated by it in March, the usual racing time. The race ended up being 306 km long, with a heavy detour through the Langhe hills and the Tanaro river valley before reaching the western Ligurian coast through the Col di Nava pass and the Colle San Bartolomeo tunnel, only reaching the usual route at Imperia.

Winners

Most winsRiders in italics are still activeWins per country

Primavera Rosa

From 1999 to 2005 seven editions of Milan–San Remo for women were held. The race was organized on the same day and finished in Sanremo shortly before the men, but covered a shorter distance. The start was not in Milan, but in Varazze, hence it was named Primavera Rosa. It was part of the UCI Women's Road World Cup. The 2006 edition was initially planned but cancelled before the event. Russian Zoulfia Zabirova was the only rider to win twice.

Granfondo Milano-Sanremo
The Granfondo Milano-Sanremo is an annual cyclosportive event for recreational cyclists over the same course as the professional race from Milan to San Remo. It is one of the oldest Granfondos in Italy, founded in 1971 by the Unione Cicloturistica Sanremo and popular among cyclotourists from all over the world. It is currently held the second Sunday in June and 2021 (postponed from 2020) was its 50th edition.

In Popular Culture
 The race features in the 1980 Italian comedy film Fantozzi contro tutti''.
 The 1910 race is the subject of the 2006 graphic novel "La Primavera" by Alexis Frederick-Frost.

Notes

References

External links

 
 

 
Classic cycle races
Cycle races in Italy
UCI ProTour races
UCI Road World Cup races
UCI World Tour races
Recurring sporting events established in 1907
1907 establishments in Italy
Sport in Liguria
Sport in Lombardy
Sports competitions in Milan
Sanremo
Challenge Desgrange-Colombo races
Super Prestige Pernod races